Douglas Alan Racine (born October 7, 1952) is an American politician and former Vermont Secretary of Human Services, a former Vermont State Senator and was the 79th lieutenant governor of Vermont from 1997 to 2003. He is a Democrat.  Racine was a candidate for the 2010 Democratic nomination for Governor of Vermont.  He previously ran for governor in 2002, but lost to Republican Jim Douglas. In an election where no candidate won a majority, Douglas won a 45% plurality, and Racine declined to contest the outcome before the Vermont General Assembly.

Biography
Racine is a 1970 graduate of Burlington High School. He graduated with an A.B. in politics from Princeton University in 1974 after completing a senior thesis titled "Changes in Interplay Competition in Vermont." Racine worked as a legislative assistant for Senator Patrick Leahy.  He has long been involved in his family's business, the Willie Racine's, Inc. Jeep dealership founded by his father, of which he has served as vice president.

Racine served 5 terms in the Vermont Senate (1983–93). He was Chairman of the Senate Natural Resources and Energy Committee and President Pro Tem of the Senate (1989–93).  He was elected Lieutenant Governor in 1996 and served three terms (1997–2003) with Governor Howard Dean.

He was the Democratic nominee for governor in 2002, but lost to Republican Jim Douglas. Because no candidate won a majority, the Vermont General Assembly had to decide.  The General Assembly almost always votes for the candidate who received a plurality.  Racine did not contest the results, and the legislature chose Douglas.

In 2006, Racine was again elected to the Vermont Senate, representing the Chittenden Senate District.  He was re-elected in 2008.

Racine ran for the 2010 Democratic nomination for Governor of Vermont.   In the 5-way Democratic primary on August 24, 2010, Racine placed second with 18,079 votes (24.22%) to first-place winner Peter Shumlin's 18,276 votes (24.48%).  Racine requested a recount, which reaffirmed Shumlin's nomination.  Shumlin then defeated Republican Lieutenant Governor Brian Dubie in the November 2, 2010 general election.

On November 30, 2010, Gov.-elect Shumlin nominated Racine to be his Secretary of Human Services. On August 12, 2014, Governor Shumlin announced the departure of Racine from the same post.

References

External links

|-

|-

1952 births
Lieutenant Governors of Vermont
Living people
Politicians from Burlington, Vermont
Presidents pro tempore of the Vermont Senate
Democratic Party Vermont state senators
Princeton University alumni
Burlington High School (Vermont) alumni